Dimorphocalyx is a genus of plants under the family Euphorbiaceae first described as a genus in 1861. It is native to Southeast Asia, Hainan, India, Sri Lanka, New Guinea, and Queensland.

Species

Formerly included
moved to Actephila Blachia Trigonostemon

References

Codiaeae
Euphorbiaceae genera